The Blue Geranium may refer to:
A short story in the book The Thirteen Problems, by Agatha Christie.
An episode in the 5th series of ITV's Agatha Christie's Marple, see List of Agatha Christie's Marple episodes.